Drakensang: The River of Time is a role-playing video game developed by Radon Labs. Drakensang TROT is the second video game in The Dark Eye-universe since Attic's Northlands Trilogy from the 1990s (Realms of Arkania: Blade of Destiny, Realms of Arkania: Star Trail and Realms of Arkania: Shadows over Riva).

Story
Though released after Drakensang: The Dark Eye, and playable as stand-alone game, in-story it serves as a prequel. The game takes place around the city of Nadoret. Nadoret lies south of the city of Ferdok, the main hub of the first installment. From Nadoret the player travels the Great River to reveal a series of pirate attacks. Over the course of the game he teams up with Ardo of Boarstock, the thief Cuano and the dwarf Forgrimm, who also appeared in Drakensang: The Dark Eye.

Gameplay
Just like the original Drakensang, it has a traditional RPG party-based style, with a 'real-time with pause' round-based playmode as seen in games like Baldur's Gate or Neverwinter Nights.  Using a largely faithful version of the pen and paper rules, statistics, skills and talents are leveled up through universal experience points which can be applied to anything from skills which increase the amount of information found on the minimap to skills useful for combat or negotiation.  The River of Time also addressed minor criticisms of the first game, such as the player's inability to return to most areas once completed.

It was released in Germany in February 2010, followed by an expansion pack called Phileasson's Secret in August 2010. It was released in English in January 2011, Phileasson's Secret in May 2011.

Reception 

Drakensang: The River of Time was received positively in the German press and generally praised as an improvement over the first title. It won the "Best RPG 2010" at the German Developer Awards in Essen, Germany.

However, this second game of the franchise did not fare well financially, and subsequently Radon Labs were declared bankrupt and acquired by Bigpoint Games. The Drakensang brand was then turned into an online browser game franchise, that no longer connects to The Dark Eye franchise.

References 

2010 video games
Fantasy video games
Role-playing video games
Video game prequels
THQ games
Video games developed in Germany
Video games featuring protagonists of selectable gender
Video games with expansion packs
Windows games
Windows-only games
Video games based on tabletop role-playing games
DTP Entertainment games
Single-player video games
Radon Labs games